The Collection 1982–1988 is a French-language compilation album by Canadian singer Celine Dion, released in Europe in 1997. It features twenty-eight rare songs recorded between 1982 and 1988 on a two-CD set. Previously these songs were released on separate albums: Gold Vol. 1 (1995) and C'est pour vivre (1997). The album was issued under many different titles, with many different covers, and by various music labels. It charted in European countries reaching number eleven in Denmark, number twenty in Belgium Wallonia, number twenty-seven in Sweden and number thirty-seven in the Netherlands.

Background and content
Thanks to the success of D'eux, which became the best-selling French-language album of all time, various music labels around the world issued compilations with Dion's early and rare recordings from the 1980s. After 1995's Gold Vol. 1 and 1997's C'est pour vivre, a two-CD compilation featuring songs from both of these albums was released in 1997 and 1998 in Europe. It was issued under many various titles: The Collection 1982–1988, The Greatest Hits 1982–1988, Premiers succès, Amour, Sus Canciones Más Bellas, C'est pour toi, Lo Mejor de Céline Dion, The French Collection, The French Love Album, The Solid Gold Collection, The Best of the Early Years: The French Collection, Ne partez pas sans moi and Avec toi: the Very Best of the Early Years. The compilations were released with many different covers and by various music labels.

Critical reception and commercial performance
Jose F. Promis of AllMusic gave The Collection 1982–1988 two and a half out of five stars and wrote that this album collects most of Dion's essential recordings from her pre-superstar years, when she was a very young French singer, popular in Canada and France. Promis noted the heavily synthesized Europop of the 1988 Eurovision contest winner "Ne partez pas sans moi", which was the song that introduced Dion to international audiences, and is a milestone in her career. According to him, many of the songs on this set are fair, and differ from the processed teen pop of the late 1990s because of the ever-present sincerity in Dion's voice. Highlights include the elegant ballads "Tellement j'ai d'amour pour toi", "Benjamin", and "La voix du bon Dieu", the shimmering "Avec toi" and "Du soleil au cœur;" and the anthemic "C'est pour vivre". Other songs almost make the mark, such as the dramatic "La religieuse", but are marred by sometimes bizarre production, and, in this case, a truly off-putting bridge. Others are sing-song, nursery rhyme-type material, especially "Hymne à l'amitié" and the incredibly 1980s sounding "Hello Mister Sam".

The Collection 1982–1988 peaked inside top forty in European countries, reaching number eleven in Denmark (in July 1998), number twenty in Belgium Wallonia (in August 1997), number twenty-seven in Sweden (in March 1998) and number thirty-seven in the Netherlands (in March 1998).

Track listings

Charts

Release history

References

External links
 

1997 compilation albums
Albums produced by Eddy Marnay
Celine Dion compilation albums